Richard Tolson (1622–1689) was an English lawyer and politician who sat in the House of Commons  from 1646 to 1648 and in 1660.

Biography
Tolson was the son of Henry Tolson of Bridekirk in west Cumbria and his wife Margaret Savile, daughter of Henry Savile of Wath. He matriculated at Oriel College, Oxford on 17 October 1639, aged 17. He entered Lincoln's Inn in 1641 and also Gray's Inn in 1646.

In 1646, Tolson was elected Member of Parliament for Cumberland and sat until 1648 when he was secluded under Pride's Purge. He was called to the Bar in 1656.

In 1660, Tolson was elected MP for Cockermouth for the Convention Parliament. He was inactive in parliament. In 1667, he was High Sheriff of Cumberland.

Tolson was buried at Wath on 2 July 1689.

Family
Tolson married  Anne Gregory, daughter of Gilbert Gregory of Barnby-upon-Don, Yorkshire, in around 1650 and had five sons.

Notes

References

1622 births
1689 deaths
Alumni of Oriel College, Oxford
English lawyers
High Sheriffs of Cumberland
Members of Lincoln's Inn
Members of Gray's Inn
People from Cockermouth
English MPs 1640–1648
English MPs 1660